Joint stock company Royal Flight Airlines, formerly Abakan-Avia, was a charter airline based in Abakan, Republic of Khakassia, Russia. It operated charter services between Russian cities and various holiday destinations in Asia, Europe, the Middle East, Africa, and the Caribbean. Its main base was the Abakan Airport (ABA).

History 
The airline was established in 1992 as Abakan-Avia and started operations in 1993. It was established from a former Aeroflot unit, and started domestic cargo flights in 1993 and international flights in 1994. Sobol acquired a 70% share in 1999. It had 76 employees (at March 2007). In 2002, a proposed merger with RusAir failed. In July 2014, it was purchased by Russian tour operator Coral Travel and renamed Royal Flight Airlines on 11 July 2014.

In May 2022, Royal Flight ceased all operations.

Destinations

As of July 2019, Royal Flight operates to the following destinations:

Fleet 
As of March 2022, the Royal Flight fleet consisted of the following aircraft:

See also 
 List of defunct airlines of Russia

References

Bibliography

External links 

 

Defunct airlines of Russia
Airlines established in 1992
Airlines disestablished in 2022
Cargo airlines of Russia
Russian companies established in 2014
2022 disestablishments in Russia
Companies based in Khakassia
Abakan